Place Montreal Trust is a shopping mall in Montreal, Quebec, Canada, located west of the Eaton Centre, at the corner of Saint Catherine Street and McGill College Avenue in the city's downtown core. Its indoor water fountain has the highest water spout in North America at 30 metres in height. Place Montreal Trust is linked to the Underground City of Montreal.

The Bell Media Tower is part of the Place Montreal Trust complex.

History 

Place Montreal Trust was originally proposed to house a concert hall, in the mall's mezzanine and basement level. However, this design called for an office tower that would partially obstruct the view of Mount Royal from McGill College Avenue. The plan encountered public opposition, including from architectural activist Phyllis Lambert, a member of the board of directors of Cadillac Fairview, who participated in protests against her own company's plan. This idea of a concert hall on McGill College was abandoned in favour of a design for Place Montreal Trust with a wider setback, as part of a redesign of McGill College Avenue as a widened scenic avenue.
 
The shopping mall of Place Montreal Trust was opened by Cadillac Fairview in 1988. At the time, Cadillac Fairview dubbed the mall as one its five (self-titled) "fashion centres" that also included Promenades Saint-Bruno, Fairview Pointe-Claire, Carrefour Laval and Galeries d'Anjou. Cadillac Fairview still use the "fashion centre" branding to this day, but not on Place Montreal Trust as it no longer owns the mall.

Ivanhoe Inc assumed the management of the shopping mall in August 1995, while Cadillac Fairview continued to manage the office building.

On July 7, 1999, Ivanhoe acquired 100% of Place Montreal Trust as part of a $20 million package intended to position Place Montreal Trust a major player in the Downtown Montreal revitalization plan.

Recently, a new investment of $15 million enabled the complete renovation of the food court and the first level of the shopping centre.

In July 1998, Place Montreal Trust became home to Montreal's Planet Hollywood restaurant.  The restaurant did brisk business for the first year, but closed in September 2001.  The entrance to the restaurant was on the North/West corner of the Saint Catherine Street as well as the third floor of the mall.  It has since been converted back to retail space.

Atrium and fountain

Place Montreal Trust's atrium allows maximum use of natural light and features a large indoor water fountain. Its 30-metre water spout is the highest in North America. During the holiday season, a giant illuminated Christmas tree filled with animated storybook characters stands just as tall.

List of anchor stores

See also 
Underground City, Montreal
List of shopping malls in Montreal

References

External links

Official website

Postmodern architecture in Canada
Shopping malls established in 1988
Shopping malls in Montreal
Buildings and structures completed in 1988
Downtown Montreal
Ivanhoé Cambridge
1988 establishments in Quebec